O.G.C. (an initialism for Originoo Gunn Clappaz) is an American hip hop trio composed of members Starang Wondah, Top Dog and Louieville Sluggah. The group is mostly known through their membership in the Boot Camp Clik, along with Buckshot, Smif-N-Wessun and Heltah Skeltah.

Discography

Studio albums

Singles

References

External links 
 Duckdown Records

Five percenters
American musical trios
Boot Camp Clik members
Hardcore hip hop groups
Musical groups from Brooklyn
African-American musical groups
Hip hop groups from New York City
People from Brownsville, Brooklyn
The Fab 5 members